Intoxicated is the debut studio album by German recording artist Gracia. It was released by BMG on October 13, 2003, in German-speaking Europe, following her participation in the debut season of Deutschland sucht den Superstar, where she had finished fifth. Taking her work further into the hard rock and pop rock genres, Gracia worked with a small team of collaborators on the album, including duos Christian Hamm and Alain Bertoni as well as Grant Michael B. and Pomez di Lorenzo, among others. Its release was preceded by the singles "I Don’t Think So!" and "I Believe in Miracles", a top ten and a top 20 entry on the German Singles Chart, respectively.

The album received mixed reviews from critics, with laut.de calling it a collection of "shallow pop songs for underage braces carriers", but enjoyed commercial success, debuting and peaking at number 10 on the German Albums Chart. With sales in excess of 50,000 copies, Intoxicated became third highest-selling album released by a first season DSDS finalist – only behind Alexander Klaws's Take Your Chance (2003) and Daniel Küblböck's Positive Energie (2003). However, lackluster sales resulted into the release of no further singles and the termination of her recording contract with BMG, making Intoxicated her only album with the label.

Track listing
Credits adapted from the liner notes of Intoxicated.

Charts

References

2003 debut albums